Terentius Maximus was a Roman also known as the Pseudo-Nero who rebelled during the reign of Titus, but was suppressed.  He resembled Nero in appearance and in action, as he was known to perform singing with the accompaniment of the lyre.

He gained his followers first in Asia, and then gained many more during his march to the Euphrates. He later fled to Parthia and tried to gain their support by claiming that they owed him (claiming as Nero) some requital for the return of Armenia. Artabanus III, a Parthian leader, out of anger towards Titus, both received him and made preparations to reinstate him to Rome. He was executed when his true identity was revealed.

Notes

Literature about the False Nero
 Lion Feuchtwanger, Der falsche Nero (The Pretender), 1936

Terentii
1st-century deaths

1st-century Roman usurpers
Impostor pretenders
Year of birth unknown
Nero